The Men's Omnium competition of the cycling events at the 2011 Pan American Games was held between October 18 and 19 at the Pan American Velodrome in Guadalajara. The event was a new addition to the track cycling program at the Pan American Games.

Results

Flying Lap

Points Race

Elimination Race

Individual Pursuit

Scratch Race

1 km Time Trial

Final standings

References

Track cycling at the 2011 Pan American Games
Men's omnium